Sotome may refer to:
 Sotome, Nagasaki, a former town located in Nishisonogi District, Nagasaki, Japan
 Kōichirō Sōtome, the director of the adaptation of the Kenkō Zenrakei Suieibu Umishō manga into an anime television series
 Kozue Sotome, an author who described the fungus species Polyporus phyllostachydis